J. Robert Brookens (February 8, 1950) is a former Republican member of the Kansas House of Representatives, representing the 70th district.  He started serving in 2009.

Brookens did not run for re-election in 2012 and his term ended at the commencement of the 2013 legislative session.

Committee membership
 Education
 Corrections and Juvenile Justice
 Judiciary

Major donors
The top 5 donors to Brookens's 2008 campaign:
1. Kansas National Education Assoc 	$750 	
2. Mark A Nichols Dir of Public Affairs Rock Industries Inc 	$500 	
3. Brookens, John W 	$500 	
4. Kansas Contractors Assoc 	$500 	
5. Kansas Agribusiness Council 	$500

References

External links
 Kansas Legislature - J. Robert Brookens
 Project Vote Smart profile
 Kansas Votes profile
 Campaign contributions: 2008

Republican Party members of the Kansas House of Representatives
Living people
21st-century American politicians
1950 births